This is a list of all female winners in FIS Alpine Ski World Cup from 1967 to present. The list includes all downhill, super-G, giant slalom, slalom, combined and parallel/city events, but does not show team events.

Disciplines were introduced in World Cup: downhill, giant slalom and slalom  in 1967; Combined and parallel slalom in 1975; super-G in 1982, super combined in 2006 and renamed to alpine combined in 2015.

Winners

Last updated: 19 March 2023

Katharina Gutensohn, who performed as Katrin under Austria achieved her total of eight world cup victories under three different flags: Austria (4), West Germany (2) and Germany (2).
Michaela Gerg-Leitner achieved total of four world cup victories under two different flags: West Germany (3) and Germany (1).
Christina Meier achieved total of two world cup victories under two different flags: West Germany (1) and Germany (1).

Consecutive seasons with at least one win

Records

Statistics

Milestones
 First to win 10 races in one event:  Annemarie Moser-Pröll  (downhill)
 First to win 20 races in one event:  Annemarie Moser-Pröll  (downhill)
 First to win 30 races in one event:  Annemarie Moser-Pröll  (downhill)
 First to win 40 races in one event:  Lindsey Vonn  (downhill)
 First to win 50 races in one event:  Mikaela Shiffrin   (slalom)

 First to win 10 races in two events:  Annemarie Moser-Pröll  (downhill and giant slalom)
 First to win 20 races in two events:  Vreni Schneider  (slalom and giant slalom)
 First to win 30 races in two events: pending
 First to win 40 races in two events: pending

 First to win races in three events:  Nancy Greene  (downhill, slalom and giant slalom)
 First to win races in four events:  Annemarie Moser-Pröll  (downhill, slalom, giant slalom and combined)
 First to win races in five events:  Petra Kronberger  (downhill, super G, slalom, giant slalom and combined)
 First to win races in six events:  Mikaela Shiffrin  (downhill, super G, slalom, giant slalom, combined and parallel slalom)
 First to win 10 races in three events: pending
 First to win 5 races in four events: pending
 First to win 5 races in all five events: pending

External links
FIS-ski.com – official results for FIS alpine World Cup events

Women's race winners
World Cup women's race winners
Lists of female skiers
FIs